Jeff Farmer (born 24 June 1977) is a former Australian rules footballer of Aboriginal descent. He was the first indigenous player to kick 400 goals in the Australian Football League (AFL).

Melbourne career
Known as "The Wizard" (or "The Wiz") because of his uncanny ability to create goals from nothing, Farmer began his professional football career with the Melbourne Football Club in 1995. Farmer has always been one of the AFL's most exciting players.

His career best goalkicking performance came against Collingwood at the MCG in 2000 when he kicked 9 goals in the second half after barely being able to get a touch in the first two-quarters. He was taken from the field for the third quarter and was on the interchange bench before Ben Beams suffered a broken wrist and was unable to continue. He finished the 2000 season with a career best 76 goals and was named in the All-Australian team.

After 118 games and 259 goals for Melbourne, he was traded to Fremantle at the end of 2001.

Fremantle career
Farmer's first two seasons with Fremantle were disappointing, with less than 30 goals in each year, but in 2004, his consistency improved and he was the Dockers' 2nd most productive forward for each of the 2004, 2005 and 2006 seasons.

During the 2006 home and away season, Farmer had his most productive season since 2000, kicking 55 goals from just 19 games, with a 31 goals in 7 games effort towards the end of the season. Due to this run of good form, he was thought by many to be a good chance of making All-Australian selection in the forward pocket. He was not, however, selected.

At the end of the 2008 AFL season Farmer announced his retirement from AFL football, leaving him stranded on 249 games. His 483 career goals, including three in his final game, is the 49th most in VFL/AFL history and his 224 goals for Fremantle is second behind Matthew Pavlich.

Statistics

|- style="background-color: #EAEAEA"
! scope="row" style="text-align:center" | 1995
|style="text-align:center;"|
| 33 || 7 || 4 || 5 || 31 || 14 || 45 || 10 || 3 || 0.6 || 0.7 || 4.4 || 2.0 || 6.4 || 1.4 || 0.4
|-
! scope="row" style="text-align:center" | 1996
|style="text-align:center;"|
| 33 || 19 || 37 || 24 || 130 || 91 || 221 || 38 || 25 || 1.9 || 1.3 || 6.8 || 4.8 || 11.6 || 2.0 || 1.3
|- style="background-color: #EAEAEA"
! scope="row" style="text-align:center" | 1997
|style="text-align:center;"|
| 33 || 17 || 30 || 17 || 115 || 63 || 178 || 40 || 16 || 1.8 || 1.0 || 6.8 || 3.7 || 10.5 || 2.4 || 0.9
|-
! scope="row" style="text-align:center" | 1998
|style="text-align:center;"|
| 33 || 19 || 47 || 33 || 149 || 55 || 204 || 45 || 18 || 2.5 || 1.7 || 7.8 || 2.9 || 10.7 || 2.4 || 0.9
|- style="background-color: #EAEAEA"
! scope="row" style="text-align:center" | 1999
|style="text-align:center;"|
| 8 & 33 || 19 || 32 || 27 || 129 || 51 || 180 || 35 || 20 || 1.7 || 1.4 || 6.8 || 2.7 || 9.5 || 1.8 || 1.1
|-
! scope="row" style="text-align:center" | 2000
|style="text-align:center;"|
| 33 || 23 || 76 || 36 || 196 || 84 || 280 || 84 || 36 || 3.3 || 1.6 || 8.5 || 3.7 || 12.2 || 3.7 || 1.6
|- style="background-color: #EAEAEA"
! scope="row" style="text-align:center" | 2001
|style="text-align:center;"|
| 33 || 14 || 33 || 16 || 132 || 59 || 191 || 44 || 19 || 2.4 || 1.1 || 9.4 || 4.2 || 13.6 || 3.1 || 1.4
|-
! scope="row" style="text-align:center" | 2002
|style="text-align:center;"|
| 7 || 20 || 29 || 27 || 187 || 89 || 276 || 77 || 38 || 1.5 || 1.4 || 9.4 || 4.5 || 13.8 || 3.9 || 1.9
|- style="background-color: #EAEAEA"
! scope="row" style="text-align:center" | 2003
|style="text-align:center;"|
| 33 || 20 || 27 || 16 || 126 || 60 || 186 || 36 || 28 || 1.4 || 0.8 || 6.3 || 3.0 || 9.3 || 1.8 || 1.4
|-
! scope="row" style="text-align:center" | 2004
|style="text-align:center;"|
| 33 || 22 || 36 || 24 || 153 || 63 || 216 || 66 || 51 || 1.6 || 1.1 || 7.0 || 2.9 || 9.8 || 3.0 || 2.3
|- style="background-color: #EAEAEA"
! scope="row" style="text-align:center" | 2005
|style="text-align:center;"|
| 33 || 19 || 35 || 16 || 162 || 60 || 222 || 58 || 38 || 1.8 || 0.8 || 8.5 || 3.2 || 11.7 || 3.1 || 2.0
|-
! scope="row" style="text-align:center" | 2006
|style="text-align:center;"|
| 33 || 22 || 55 || 21 || 192 || 62 || 254 || 70 || 57 || 2.5 || 1.0 || 8.7 || 2.8 || 11.5 || 3.2 || 2.6
|- style="background-color: #EAEAEA"
! scope="row" style="text-align:center" | 2007
|style="text-align:center;"|
| 33 || 8 || 19 || 10 || 80 || 35 || 115 || 40 || 16 || 2.4 || 1.3 || 10.0 || 4.4 || 14.4 || 5.0 || 2.0
|-
! scope="row" style="text-align:center" | 2008
|style="text-align:center;"|
| 33 || 20 || 23 || 13 || 206 || 102 || 308 || 85 || 34 || 1.2 || 0.7 || 10.3 || 5.1 || 15.4 || 4.3 || 1.7
|- class="sortbottom"
! colspan=3| Career
! 249
! 483
! 285
! 1988
! 888
! 2876
! 728
! 399
! 1.9
! 1.1
! 8.0
! 3.6
! 11.6
! 2.9
! 1.6
|}

Controversial incidents
In November 2004, Farmer pleaded guilty to assaulting his long-time girlfriend and was fined $2,000.

In December 2006 he was alleged to have been involved in a nightclub fight in which a Subiaco Football Club player, Greg Broughton, suffered a broken eye socket. No charges were laid.

Farmer was arrested in April 2007 and charged with assault for knocking out a security guard at a Perth nightclub after being refused entry. The Fremantle Football Club fined him $5,100 and suspended him for a further 6 weeks on top of his existing AFL enforced suspension for eye gouging another player during a pre-season game, which was his 10th suspension and his 14th appearance before the tribunal. In court, Farmer pleaded guilty to assault and was fined $3,000.

After serving his full suspension, Farmer returned to the Fremantle side on 30 June in the round 13 game against Carlton at Subiaco Oval. Farmer together with Des Headland, who was himself implicated in another nightclub fight during the week, were amongst the best players on the field and led the way to a 77-point thrashing. This was Fremantle's second highest ever score and their greatest winning margin ever against Carlton. Headland kicked 5 goals and Farmer kicked 4 goals and each set up many more for their teammates.

In July 2007, police charged Farmer with criminal damage after he smashed a car's side mirror in a rage after being ejected from Burswood Casino. In court he pleaded guilty to the charge and was fined $750 (with $400 compensation and $58 costs). Despite the previous conviction which was considered his last chance at the club, Fremantle did not suspend him, but fined him $10,000 (the maximum allowed under the AFL Players Association rules) and requested he donate $20,000 to charity. He was recalled to play for Fremantle the following week against league leaders Geelong.

On 18 August 2007, in the third quarter of a match against St Kilda at Telstra Dome, Farmer received facial injuries from a behind the play incident and was assisted from the playing area, bleeding and suffering a concussion. The incident was not witnessed by umpires, nor by any of the TV broadcast cameras. Network Ten commentator Michael Voss stated soon afterwards that he saw what happened and added that St Kilda tagger Steven Baker would be hoping it had not been captured by TV cameras. Farmer took no further part in the match, which St Kilda won by 30 points. Baker was later handed a 7-game suspension by the AFL tribunal, after being charged with rough conduct on Farmer. St Kilda appealed the decision, and included a letter from Farmer to the AFL pleading for leniency on Baker, describing Baker as one of his most respected opponents. The letter could not be accepted in the appeal, because it was new evidence. The appeal was rejected and the suspension remained.

On 25 June 2008 it was announced that Farmer was suspended for a week by the Fremantle Football Club for not attending a compulsory recovery session after the weekend's loss to St Kilda in Melbourne.

Farmer retired at the conclusion of the 2008 AFL season.

South Fremantle career
Jeff Farmer decided to come out of retirement to play for South Fremantle Football Club in WAFL for 2009 season.

External links

References

1977 births
Living people
Australian rules footballers from Western Australia
Melbourne Football Club players
Fremantle Football Club players
South Fremantle Football Club players
All-Australians (AFL)
Indigenous Australian players of Australian rules football
Indigenous Australians from Western Australia
People from Tambellup, Western Australia
Western Australian State of Origin players
Australia international rules football team players